Senator Cotton may refer to:
 Bob Cotton (1915–2006), Australian senator from New South Wales
 Joseph R. Cotton (1890–1983), Massachusetts State Senator
 Norris Cotton (1900–1989), U.S. senator from New Hampshire
 Tom Cotton (born 1977), U.S. senator from Arkansas